The World Figure Skating Championships is an annual figure skating competition sanctioned by the International Skating Union in which amateur figure skaters compete for the title of World Champion.

The 1949 championships took place from February 16 to 18 in Paris, France. At the men's event, the favorite, Dick Button won. At the women's event, however, the favorite, Eva Pawlik of Austria, who had been the Olympic runner-up behind Barbara Ann Scott one year before and who had just won the European title in 1949, dropped out because of a broken boot heel just before the free program. which provided Alena Vrzáňová of Czechoslovakia with the opportunity to win the gold medal. She became the first woman to perform a double lutz.

Results

Men

Judges:
 E. Kucharz 
 H. Meistrup 
 Ferenc Kertesz 
 Mario Verdi 
 Harold G. Storke

Ladies

Judges:
 Adolf Rosdol 
 Georges Torchon 
 Kenneth Beaumont 
 Ferenc Kertesz 
 Josef Vosolsobe 
 Harold G. Storke 
 Dr. J. Koch

Pairs
*: better placed due to the majority of the better placings

Judges:
 Adolf Rosdol 
 Georges Torchon 
 Mollie Phillips 
 Ferenc Kertesz 
 E. Finsterwald 
 Josef Vosolsobe 
 Harold G. Storke

References

Sources
 Result list provided by the ISU

World Figure Skating Championships
World Figure Skating Championships
International figure skating competitions hosted by France
World Figure Skating Championships
World Figure Skating Championships
World Figure Skating Championships
International sports competitions hosted by Paris